The Punpun River is a tributary of the Ganges. It originates in Palamu district of Jharkhand and flows through Chatra, Aurangabad, Gaya and Patna districts of the Indian states of Jharkhand and Bihar. Punpun is a place named after the Punpun river in Patna which is situated on the bank of Punpun river. On the bank of Punpun people celebrate Chhath Puja.

Course

Many towns such as Sigori are located on the banks of the river.

Tributaries
The main tributaries of the Punpun are – the Butane, the Madar and the Mohar.

Other features
However, during rains, the Punpun often causes heavy flood damages east of Patna city.

Religious significance
This river is mentioned in the Vayu and the Padma Puranas in connection with Gaya Mahatmya as the punah-punah (again and again) of which Pun-Pun is the colloquial form. The river might have been called by this name because it was frequently in spate. The Puranas interpret the word punah-punah in a spiritual sense that sins are removed again and again by offering oblations to forefathers in the river.

References

 
Rivers of Jharkhand
Rivers of Bihar
Tributaries of the Ganges
Rivers of India